Cockatoo Valley is a locality in the Australian state of South Australia located about  north-east of the state capital of Adelaide and about  south-west of the municipal seat of Nuriootpa.

It was first seen and named by Europeans on 3 March 1838 when an exploration party of four young horsemen comprising John Hill, William Wood, Charles Willis, and John Oakden camped there on the first overland expedition from Adelaide to reach the River Murray at present Morgan. Oakden reported that the valley was 'swarming with cockatoos, seven of which were shot' to roast for supper. They encamped there at 'a rivulet' they had discovered, later named Yettie Creek.

The 2016 Australian census which was conducted in August 2016 reports that Cockatoo Valley shared 700 people with the locality of Sandy Creek.

Cockatoo Valley is located within the federal division of Barker, the state electoral district of Schubert and the local government area of the Barossa Council.

References

Notes

Citations

Towns in South Australia